Harold Hart (4 January 1889 – 2 January 1953) was an Australian cricketer. He played ten first-class cricket matches for Victoria between 1910 and 1915.

See also
 List of Victoria first-class cricketers

References

External links
 

1889 births
1953 deaths
Australian cricketers
Victoria cricketers
Cricketers from Melbourne